Neubrunn may refer to:

Neubrunn, Lower Franconia, a municipality in Lower Franconia, Bavaria, Germany
Neubrunn, Thuringia, a municipality in Thuringia, Germany
Neubrunn (river), a river of Thuringia, Germany